Ian Brusasco AO, AM(4 October 1928 – 13 May 2021) was an Australian businessman who served as chairman and director for WorkCover Queensland, Queensland Investment Corporation, Gladstone Ports Corporation, Foodbank Qld, Port of Brisbane Corporation, Australian Soccer Federation (now Football Federation Australia), Queensland Soccer Federation, Oceania Football Confederation, Brisbane Strikers, Radio Station 4TAB, Radio Station 4KQ, and Labor Holdings. Brusasco also served as an alderman in the Brisbane City Council for 14 years.

He was married to Patricia Anne Brusasco (born 11 May 1933) who received a Medal of the Order of Australia (OAM) in the Queen's Birthday Honours List in 1992 and a Centenary Medal in 2001, both in recognition of service to the community. He was the father of Mark Brusasco (born 24 August 1960) who played international soccer for Australia in 1980.

Early life
Brusasco was born Italo Prospero Brusasco on 4 October 1928 in Lannercost, a small farming community near Ingham in north Queensland. He changed his name by deed poll to Ian in 1969. His parents, Felice and Irma (nee Torre) emigrated to Australia in 1923 from the small, northern Italian village of Cuccaro Monferrato. Ian's cousin Pier Giuseppe Brusasco was mayor of the village from 1999 until 2009. As a young man, Brusasco's father, Felice, had been a political prisoner for opposing Mussolini and after completing his 2 year compulsory military service, it was quietly suggested he flee the country for his own safety. Felice had wanted to follow the big migration of Italians to Argentina, but unable to get there, he instead boarded a ship for Sydney with the brother of his fiancee. Irma was just 18 years old when she followed on her own soon after, travelling for several months by ship and knowing only a few words of English. Once reunited, the couple married in Townsville in 1926.

Brusasco attended both Catholic and state primary schools in Ingham and Brisbane. He did his secondary education at St Joseph's Nudgee College from 1943–1946, though he says it is still a mystery to him how he ended up there. By his own admission, he was not a brilliant student and his parents could not afford to pay the fees. His best guess is that the nuns at his Brisbane convent school either took pity on him, or saw a spark of something to be encouraged and recommended he attend. At secondary school, he discovered a passion and talent for sport, playing in the Rugby First XV.

After studying medicine at the University of Queensland for two years, Brusasco switched to pharmacy at the Brisbane Technical College. He qualified as a pharmacist in 1955 and opened his own pharmacy soon after in Brisbane's Albert St. He expanded and eventually owned several pharmacies in the Brisbane area with his wife Patricia Anne (nee Wilson), a fellow pharmacy student he married in 1956.

Business
Brusasco spent many decades chairing and serving on a variety of boards, spanning the political, sporting, industrial and philanthropic life of Queensland and Australia.

Politics
Brusasco officially joined the Ashgrove, Queensland branch of the ALP in 1960. Brusasco initially stood as a candidate for the ALP, unsuccessfully, in Kurilpa in the 1969 Queensland State election and later, unsuccessfully again, in Nundah in the 1972 state election. Encouraged by former Brisbane Lord Mayor, Clem Jones, Brusasco stood and won for the party in the Brisbane City Council election in 1970. He served for 14 years as an alderman, representing the wards of Toombul, Lutwyche and Spring Hill and serving as chairman of both the Health and Planning Committees.

In his maiden speech in the council chamber, he outlined why he felt it was important for a town like Brisbane to have proper, world-class sporting facilities. Just a few months prior, Brusasco had returned from leading an Australian soccer team on a world tour and had been inspired by the synthetic running track he had seen in a small town in Greece. He also advocated for Brisbane to bid for the Commonwealth Games, which the city eventually hosted in 1982.

In the early 1980s, Brusasco was invited into Queensland Labor's inner executive and was asked – again at the urging of Clem Jones – to assist with the Queensland ALP's financial management and in particular, the only asset they owned; a failing AM radio station called 4KQ. Despite, knowing nothing about radio and with the station virtually bankrupt, Brusasco agreed to step in and run it. After several music format changes, 4KQ eventually devoted itself to playing country music, making it to the top of the Brisbane radio ratings within 6 years.

The ALP eventually sold the station to the Wesgo group in 1986, at the height of the boom years, in what proved to be an extremely profitable deal. Brusasco became chairman of a company called Labor Holdings, set up to invest money from the sale of 4KQ and designed to secure the financial future of the Australian Labor Party in Queensland, by providing it with a continuous source of income. He remained in this position for 5 years, eventually resigning on 31 December 1992.

Sport

Soccer

Brusasco first became involved in soccer in Australia in the 1950s at the request of his father, who at the time was president of Brisbane's Azzurri Football Club, later Brisbane City Football Club. When the club suddenly found itself without a secretary, Brusasco says his father persuaded him to take the role, despite the fact that, at the time, he'd never even seen a game. Despite his Italian heritage, he had been brought up on rugby union, during his time at St Joseph's Nudgee College.

He promised to help his father for 12 months, but once he got involved, Brusasco says he couldn't help but notice how much he felt was wrong with the club and the game at large, so he decided to remain active in the sport. He led a revolution to sweep out the old administrators from the game, helping to introduce semi-professional soccer to Queensland in 1960 and creating a new governing body in the process. He became a dominant figure in the formation of the Queensland Soccer Federation and served as its President from 1961–1965 and again from 1981–1988. This involvement led to him having a significant role on the national stage, within the Australian Soccer Federation (now Football Federation Australia) from 1960.

In 1965, Brusasco was the head of the delegation that took Australia to Cambodia, for the qualifying games of its first ever Football World Cup campaign. Of the four countries in the Asia-Oceania qualifying group South Korea had already withdrawn and South Africa was banned from participating, because of its apartheid policies. As a result, Australia faced only one opponent; North Korea. FIFA had decreed that the two qualifying matches be played in a neutral country, since North Korea not only lacked diplomatic relations with most countries, but it also did not have a suitable venue at the time. Solving the stadium problem proved difficult, until Cambodia's head of state, Norodom Sihanouk, an ally of North Korea's leader, Kim Il-Sung, allowed the matches to be held in Phnom Penh. North Korea won both matches to qualify for the 1966 World Cup in England, famously beating Italy in the group stage, before going on to make the quarter finals, where they lost to Portugal 5–3.

Brusasco also led delegations of Australian (U-16) soccer World Cup teams to China (1985), Scotland (1987) and Canada (1989). In this capacity, he was to see many of Australia's next generation graduate from "junior" football, to forming the bulk of future Socceroos' squads.

He served as President of the Australian Soccer Federation (now Football Federation Australia) from 1988–1989. While President of the Australian Soccer Federation, he was also Vice President of the Oceania Football Confederation. He served in other senior executive roles in the game, including as Senior Vice President of the Australian Soccer Federation from 1983–1986, as an Executive Member of the ASF from 1962–1990, as Vice President and Executive Member of the Oceania Football Confederation from 1986–1990 and as Chairman of the OFC's Development Committee from 1986–1990.

He was the Australian delegate to the FIFA Congress in Mexico in 1969 and Chairman of the Australian Olympic Football Task Force from 1999–2000.

He was the Chairman of the Trustee Management Group of the Brisbane Strikers from 1993–1999 and was in charge when the team won the National Soccer League grand final in 1997. This was a famous day for local football, with record attendance levels for the game in Queensland. Many within the 45,000 strong crowd at Brisbane's Lang Park ground (now Suncorp Stadium) likened the atmosphere to rugby league's showpiece State of Origin contests. Previous NSL finals had been played in front of modest crowds, but this day has been cited as heralding the emergence of the "sleeping giant" Brusasco had always predicted would awaken.

Brusasco was inducted as an inaugural member into the Australian Soccer Hall of Fame in 1999.

Rugby Union
Brusasco first played as a school boy, on the wing for St Joseph's Nudgee College in Brisbane, representing the school for two years at First XV level. The school has arguably been Queensland's greatest school boy nursery for future Queensland and Wallabies stars. He went on to play for the University of Queensland Rugby Club receiving a full blue for the sport in 1950, as well as for Brothers club. He was selected to represent Queensland in 1950. There was once speculation that he would be selected for the Australian team in a series against New Zealand and that he might be selected to tour South Africa, however a near fatal bout of hepatitis – after which he never really played the game again – spelt a premature end to his rugby career.

Queensland Academy of Sport
Brusasco became an inaugural member of the Queensland Academy of Sport in 1989 and served on the board until 1997. The QAS was established to foster elite sporting talent and to ensure that Queensland remained at the forefront of domestic and international sport.

World Masters Games
Brusasco was Chairman of the World Masters Games in Brisbane from 1993–1994.

Death
Brusasco died on 13 May 2021 at the age of 92.

Honours
On 26 January 1988, Brusasco was named a Member of the Order of Australia (AM) "in recognition of service to the sport of soccer". On 1 January 2001, he was awarded the Centenary Medal, bestowed by the Australian government for "distinguished service to business and commerce". In 2001, he was awarded the Advance Australia Foundation Award for service to business, sport and community. On 11 June 2012, he was named an Officer of the Order of Australia (AO) for "distinguished service to the community of Queensland through leadership roles with a range of public administration, sporting and charitable organisations, particularly Foodbank Queensland". In 2007, he was appointed a Queensland Ambassador for Australia Day. In 2008 he was named as a Queensland Great, awarded by the State Government to "recognise individuals and institutions for their invaluable contribution to the history and development of the state." On 18 December 2013, he was awarded an honorary doctorate by Griffith University. Brusasco's old school, St Joseph's Nudgee College established the Ian Brusasco Achievement Award "given to a student or students in the upper primary and lower secondary, who display public-spiritedness and who contribute greatly to the life of the school."

References

1928 births
2021 deaths
Australian pharmacists
Queensland Reds players
University of Queensland alumni
Australian soccer chairmen and investors
Australian people of Italian descent
Recipients of the Centenary Medal
Officers of the Order of Australia
Queensland Greats
People from North Queensland